Riders Up is a 1924 American silent drama film directed by Irving Cummings and starring Creighton Hale, George Cooper, and Kate Price.

Plot
As described in a film magazine review, Johnny is a racehorse track tout, but has concealed this fact from his respectable New England family. Norah Ryan, the daughter of the woman who runs the boarding house where he stays, is his sweetheart. He makes a big winning by gambling on a long shot racehorse at the track in Tijuana and determines to take a long-threatened visit home. However, having taken his aged friend Jeff to the track, and persuaded him that the horse Wildflower, upon whom Jeff has staked all his savings, has won, Johnny sacrifices his winnings to make good on the statement. When things look most gloomy, Norah's mother intervenes and enables Johnny to take the young woman home as his wife.

Cast

References

Bibliography
 Connelly, Robert B. The Silents: Silent Feature Films, 1910-36, Volume 40, Issue 2. December Press, 1998.
 Munden, Kenneth White. The American Film Institute Catalog of Motion Pictures Produced in the United States, Part 1. University of California Press, 1997.

External links
 

1924 films
1924 drama films
American silent feature films
American horse racing films
American sports drama films
1920s sports drama films
Films directed by Irving Cummings
American black-and-white films
Universal Pictures films
Films set in Tijuana
1920s American films
Silent American drama films
Silent sports drama films